is a Japanese confectionery company. Its headquarters are in Akasaka, Minato, Tokyo.

The company joined as a purveyor to the Imperial Court in Kyoto during the reign of Emperor Go-Yōzei.

Due to its longevity and being a family business since its founding, it is a member of the Henokiens association.

See also
 Henokiens

References

External links

Toraya Confectionery 
Toraya Confectionery 

Food and drink companies based in Tokyo
Companies established in 1600
17th-century establishments in Japan
Food and drink companies established in the 17th century
Japanese brand foods
Japanese brands
Japanese Imperial Warrant holders
Henokiens companies
Confectionery companies of Japan